Skindiving may refer to:
 Free-diving, or breath-hold underwater diving
 Scuba diving, as distinct from the use of standard diving dress (old usage dating from before drysuits and wetsuits were commonly available)
 "Skindiving", a song by James, in the album Laid